The Cancer Epidemiology Unit (CEU) is a medical research institute within Oxford University's Nuffield Department of Population Health in the United Kingdom. It is located in the Richard Doll Building on the Old Road Campus, Headington, Oxford.

Major projects
Major projects run by the CEU include the Million Women Study.
The unit is also involved with the UK Biobank project.

References

External links
 CEU website

Departments of the University of Oxford
Research institutes in Oxford
Medical research institutes in the United Kingdom
Cancer organisations based in the United Kingdom